IXY may refer to:

IXY Digital, the Japanese name for the Canon Digital IXUS
Kandla Airport, the IATA code for the airport in India
 IXYS Corporation